Ten Modern Commandments is a 1927 American silent romantic comedy-drama film that starred Esther Ralston and was distributed through Paramount Pictures. It is based on an original screen story and was directed by Dorothy Arzner.

Cast
Esther Ralston as Kitten O'Day
Neil Hamilton as Tod Gilbert
Maude Truax as Aunt Ruby
Romaine Fielding as Zeno
El Brendel as 'Speeding' Shapiro
Rose Burdick as Belle
Jocelyn Lee as Sharon Lee
Arthur Hoyt as Disbrow
Roscoe Karns as Benny

Preservation status
The film is now considered a lost film.

References

External links
 
 

1927 films
1920s romantic comedy-drama films
American romantic comedy-drama films
American silent feature films
American black-and-white films
Famous Players-Lasky films
Films directed by Dorothy Arzner
Lost American films
Paramount Pictures films
1927 lost films
Lost comedy-drama films
1927 comedy films
1927 drama films
1920s American films
1920s English-language films
Silent romantic comedy-drama films
Silent American comedy-drama films